Barbara Serra (born 19 August 1974) is an Italian-born British-based broadcast journalist and TV newsreader. Serra studied at the London School of Economics, before becoming a journalist. 

Serra has worked for the BBC, Sky News and was a presenter for Five News. Since 2006 she has been a presenter and correspondent at Al Jazeera English and since 2007 she also worked as a presenter and commentator with the Italian TV network, RAI. 
Serra was made a Knight of the Order of the Star of Italy by the Italian President and she has been recognised as one of the 20 most high-profile Italian women internationally by Elle magazine. 

In 2014, Serra wrote one book titled:  (Italians Are Not Lazy).

In 2020, Serra made the film: Fascism in the Family. She also writes for the Huffington Post.

Early life
Serra was born in Milan in 1974, with her father native to Sardinia, and her mother from Sicily. From the age of nine, she was raised in Copenhagen in Denmark. As a result of this upbringing, she is multi-lingual, speaking: Italian, English, Danish and fluent French. Serra is the granddaughter of Vitale Piga, who served as the fascist mayor of Carbonia, Sardinia from 28 September 1939 to 24 April 1942.

In 1993, she moved to the UK to study International Relations at the London School of Economics. She then undertook a Postgraduate Diploma in Broadcast Journalism at City University, London, to train as a journalist.

Career
Serra's journalistic career started at the BBC as a researcher. She spent three years working as a producer/presenter for BBC London News and produced on Radio 4's Today programme. She regularly presented EuroNews on BBC Radio Five Live. Her most challenging on-air moment was having to improvise a 5 minute radio bulletin without any scripts due to a technical mishap.

In 2003, she joined Sky News as a reporter, working on both domestic and international assignments. Serra covered a wide range of stories, from the death of Pope John Paul II in Rome, to the Michael Jackson trial in California.

Serra became part of the Five News team in 2005, following a deal between Sky News and Five to deliver Five's news programming. She became the first news presenter in the United Kingdom to present a prime time news programme in her second language on terrestrial television, with her first language as Italian.

In 2006, a newly formed news network was launched which was part of the Al Jazeera network. Serra subsequently joined Al Jazeera English in April 2006 as part of its launch-team. The role and many of the other news correspondents for the network were based in London.

As part of the Al Jazeera English team, she was a correspondent in a number of European countries and also the West Bank and Gaza between 2006 and 2009. Since September 2007, she has co-presented a weekly programme called TV Talk, broadcast on Italian state TV RAI from the Al Jazeera studios in London. The TV programme broadcasts on RAI 3, with Serra regularly speaking out about the lack of female representation on Italian television.

Her work with Al Jazeera English included the breaking news report that Palestinian farmers were been attacked by Israelis in the West Bank in 2009. Also in 2009, she shadowed Pope Benedict XVI on his trip around the Middle East. This included meeting the Pope during his controversial trip to the Holy Land. Her reports were logged on the Al Jazeera website, covering each day of the Pope's trip.

In 2013, Serra interviewed Anders Fogh Rasmussen where he discussed NATO's involvement in Afghanistan and also the success of its operations in the region.

Serra presented a TEDx talk in the city of Matera, Italy in 2014. The talk discussed the understanding of meritocracy within Italy, when compared to other aspects such as competition and ambition.

Having started as a London-based European reporter, she now works primarily as a London anchor on the flagship programme Newshour for Al Jazeera. Serra reports and anchors on location for big stories for the news and was live on air in 2013 as the conclave in Rome elected Pope Francis. She is also a stand-in presenter for The Listening Post. She has presented several programmes and documentaries, including People & Power and Streetfood Palermo on the same network. She also still works as a regular commentator for RAI.

In March 2017 she presented the prestigious Royal Television Society Journalism awards, which took place in Mayfair, London.

In 2020, Al Jazeera aired Serra's documentary, Fascism in the Family. In the documentary, Serra looks at the story of her grandfather who was mayor of Carbonia, a city built by the Benito Mussolini regime to service the local coal mines, to see what link there is between Italy’s fascist past and its present. The documentary also looks at the  rhetoric of Matteo Salvini and has a testimony from Holocaust survivor Senator Liliana Segre.

Author
As an author Serra has published the book,  (Italians Are Not Lazy) to oppose the main typical stereotype about 'Those Lazy Europeans'. The book was published in Italian only. It was released in 2014. When asked by ITALY Magazine about her book, she stated that she wanted to study European stereotypes and the real reason why many of those stereotypes exist. The book covered the stereotypical view by some that Southern European countries are lazy. Serra comments in the book that certain societies in Europe are simply less efficient than others and studies the causes of this.

Serra is also a regular writer and commentator for the Huffington Post.

Recognition
In March 2014, Serra was recognised by winning the Comete award for her book released in the same year. Serra also won the third edition of the Caccuri Literary Prize with the book, .

She was recognised by Elle Italia as one of the 20 most high-profile Italian women internationally, along with Monica Bellucci and Miuccia Prada.

In November 2015, Serra became only the second woman to receive the prestigious 12 Apostles award, after Nobel Laureate Rita Levi-Montalcini was awarded it in 1991. The award was presented for Serra's work as a writer and journalist.

In 2019 Serra received the Knighthood of the Order of the Star of Italy. She received the knighthood for raising awareness of the conditions of minorities through her journalism work.

Personal life
Serra lives in London with her husband Mark Kleinman and their son.

References

External links

1975 births
Living people
Mass media people from Milan
People from Copenhagen
Alumni of the London School of Economics
Alumni of City, University of London
British broadcast news analysts
British reporters and correspondents
BBC newsreaders and journalists
Italian journalists
Italian expatriates in Denmark
Italian expatriates in the United Kingdom
Al Jazeera people